Perrottetia heudei is a species of air-breathing land snail, a terrestrial pulmonate gastropod mollusk in the family Streptaxidae.

Distribution
This species is mainly distributed in Taiwan. Endemic to Northern Taibu Mountain in Pingtung County of Taiwan, the snail is also seen in other areas of Southern Taiwan, as well as Nishiyama in Japan.

References

External links
 

heudei
Gastropods described in 1891